Princess Victoria Elisabeth of Hohenlohe-Langenburg, 20th Duchess of Medinaceli, GE (born 17 March 1997) is a Spanish-German noblewoman. Holding 43 officially recognised titles in the Spanish nobility, she is the most titled aristocrat in the world, as well as 10 times a Grandee.

Patrilineally, a member of the House of Hohenlohe, she is the elder child of Prince Marco of Hohenlohe-Langenburg, 19th Duke of Medinaceli. Her younger brother, Prince Alexander Gonzalo of Hohenlohe-Langenburg, is the 14th Duke of Ciudad Real, 13th Marquess of Navahermosa, and a dynast of the Princely House of Hohenlohe-Langenburg.

Biography
She was born in Málaga on 17 March 1997 as the first child of Sandra Schmidt-Polex, a German, and Prince Marco of Hohenlohe-Langenburg, a German-Spanish aristocrat. Victoria is trilingual and was raised in Munich, Germany, prior to moving to Madrid to study international relations at IE University.

Her paternal grandmother was Ana Luisa de Medina, Marchioness of Navahermosa, Countess of Ofalia, who died in 2012. Victoria inherited her grandmother's countship in 2016, while her brother inherited the other title.

Upon the death of her father in 2016 (head of the Medinaceli family since 2014), she became the heir to about 40 titles of nobility related to the  House of Medinaceli. From 2017, she has been confirmed by the Spanish Ministry of Justice as the holder of five dukedoms, 16 marquessates, 17 countships (with one adelantazgo) and 4 viscountcies. With 43 titles, she is the most titled aristocrat in Spain.

She holds ten grandeeships.

Titles and arms

43 Titles

Dukedoms

 Medinaceli, with Grandeeship
 Alcalá de los Gazules, with Grandeeship
 Camiña, with Grandeeship
 Denia, with Grandeeship
 Tarifa, with Grandeeship

Marquessates

 Cilleruelo
 San Miguel das Penas y la Mota
 Aytona, with Grandeeship
 Camarasa, with Grandeeship
 (la) Torrecilla, with Grandeeship
 Priego, with Grandeeship
 Alcalá de la Alameda
 Comares
 Denia
 (las) Navas
 Malagón
 Montalbán
 Tarifa
 Villafranca
 Vila Real

Countships

 Ofalia
 San Martín de Hoyos
 Santa Gadea, with Grandeeship
 Alcoutim
 Amarante
 Castrogeriz
 Ossona
 Prades
 (del) Risco
 Aramayona
 Buendía
 Castellar
 Cocentaina
 Medellín
 (los) Molares, and Adelantada mayor of Andalusia
 Moriana del Río
 Valenza y Valladares
 Villalonso

Viscountcies 

 Bas
 Cabrera
 Linares
 Villamur

Ancestry

References 

Living people
1997 births
Dukes of Medinaceli
German people of Spanish descent
Grandees of Spain
Victoria
Victoria
Marquesses of Aitona
Victoria
Spanish people of German descent
Viscounts of Bas